is a manga series written and illustrated by Tsukasa Saimura. It is set at a high school where students suddenly become zombies. The manga was serialized in Tokuma Shoten's manga magazine Monthly Comic Ryū beginning in 2014. The series ended in the final print issue of Comic Ryū on May 19, 2018. The manga is licensed in the United States by Seven Seas Entertainment.

Plot

Release

Volumes

Reception 
Reviewing the first volume, Rebecca Silverman of Anime News Network felt that the manga distinguished itself from other zombie stories with Saimura's depiction of the zombies as still having humanity, as well as the protagonist Akira's reaction to them.

References

External links 
  at Monthly Comic Ryū 
  at Seven Seas Entertainment
 

Zombies in anime and manga
Horror anime and manga
Seinen manga
Tokuma Shoten manga
Seven Seas Entertainment titles